The World Federation of Agriculture and Food Workers (FEMTAA) was an International Trade Federation affiliated to the World Confederation of Labour (WCL).

History
The federation was established in December 1982 at a meeting in Bogota, when the World Federation of Agricultural Workers merged with the World Federation of Workers in Food, Tobacco and Hotel Industries.  Originally named the "World Federation of Agriculture and Food Workers", it later changed its official name to the World Federation of Agriculture, Food, Hotel and Allied Workers, but its older name remained in common use, and it retained its FEMTAA acronym.

In 2006, the WCL merged into the new International Trade Union Confederation, and FEMTAA dissolved, its former affiliates mostly joining the International Union of Food, Agricultural, Hotel, Restaurant, Catering, Tobacco and Allied Workers' Associations.

The federation had three regional affiliates, the Pan-African Federation of Agricultural and Food Workers, the Federation of Agricultural Workers in Latin America, and the Asian Professional Federation of Mixed Industries.

General Secretaries
1996: José Gómez Cerda
2004: Timothee T. Boko

References

Agriculture and forestry trade unions
World Confederation of Labour
Trade unions established in 1982
Trade unions disestablished in 2006